Richard Beaumont is an English former professional rugby league footballer who played  in the 2010s.

Rich made his first team début for Hull Kingston Rovers on 25 April 2011 at home to Harlequins. He also played for St Helens in the Super League.

References

External links
Saints Heritage Society profile

1988 births
Living people
English rugby league players
Hull Kingston Rovers players
Leigh Leopards players
Newcastle Thunder players
Rochdale Hornets players
Rugby league props
Rugby league players from Kingston upon Hull
St Helens R.F.C. players
Whitehaven R.L.F.C. players